The following lists events that happened during 1972 in the Grand Duchy of Luxembourg.

Incumbents

Events

January – March
 9 January - The Palais de Justice, housing the European Court of Justice, is opened on the Kirchberg plateau, Luxembourg City, marking the start of the development of the 'European quarter'.
 25 March – Representing Luxembourg, Vicky Leandros wins the Eurovision Song Contest 1972 with the song Apres Toi.

April – June
 12 April - The government buys Bourscheid Castle, which had been declared an historic monument in 1936.

July – September
 19 September - Madeleine Frieden is forced to resign as secretary of state.  Future Prime Minister Jacques Santer is brought into the government.

October – December
 22 October – The Luxembourg national football team beats Turkey 2–0 in Luxembourg City, recording Luxembourg's first victory in international football since 1969.
 24 October – Robert Schaack is appointed to the Council of State.
 11 November – Fernand Zurn is appointed to the Council of State.
 24 November – Joseph Foog is appointed to the Council of State.
 7 December – Edmond Reuter is appointed to the Council of State.
 12 December - A law is passed on marriage, regulating the rights and responsibilities of wives.
 19 November – Albert Goedert is appointed to the Council of State.
 22 December - The original Belgium-Luxembourg Economic Union treaty expires, after fifty years.  It is renewed for another ten.

Deaths

Footnotes

References